Vector Security, Inc. is the fourth largest electronic security company in the United States. They provide commercial and residential electronic mobile security and automation solutions, video surveillance, access control, and fire and intrusion protection across the United States and Canada. Through Vector Security Networks, a division of Vector Security, Inc., they also provide managed network services to multi-site businesses.
The corporate office is located in Warrendale, Pennsylvania.

History 
Vector Security, Inc. traces its roots back to The Philadelphia Contributionship (TPC), America's oldest property insurance company founded in part by Benjamin Franklin in 1752. Now the sister company of Vector Security, TPC was established as a mutual insurance company, where policyholders would come together to share risk of losses by fire.

In the 1970s, Westinghouse Security Division sold to Westec to become a franchised network of security dealers. Eventually, Vector Security was formed through the acquisition of Kilbourne Security, a Philadelphia-based Westec Dealer and Pittsburgh, PA-based Westec Dealer. The company's first name was PC Security and was then changed to Vector Security soon thereafter. Vector Security then began serving customers in Pennsylvania, Eastern Ohio and Northern West Virginia.

In 1992, Vector Security began serving national multi-site customers with the launch of its National Accounts Division, which expanded into Canada in 1996.

In 2012, the company underwent re-branding and introduced its current logo and tagline, “Intelligent security tailored for you.”

In August 2013, Vector Security acquired Industry Retail Group (IRG) to expand its offerings by adding managed network services to its portfolio of solutions for retailers and multisite businesses.

In 2015, the company acquired Pelican Security Network, Inc., a regional alliance of independent life safety and security services providers, expanding its footprint along the Gulf Coast from southwest Florida through Louisiana to Dallas/Ft. Worth, Texas.

In 2019, Vector Security acquired Nashville-based ADS Security, expanding both companies' presence in North Carolina, Kentucky and Florida, while adding new branch operations for Vector Security in Alabama, Mississippi, Georgia, South Carolina and Tennessee.

The company has won awards including Dealer of the Year by SDM Magazine (2003, 2015); numerous Sammy Awards, including Installer of the Year (Large) from SSI Magazine (2016). Police Dispatch Quality (PDQ) Award from the False Alarm Reduction Association (FARA) (2006); Central Station of the Year from Central Station Alarm Association (2006); and Frost & Sullivan Best Practices Award (2008).

Operations today 
Vector Security, Inc. provides commercial and home security systems to about 386,000 customers in North America including multi-site businesses.  The company has services and products consisting of intrusion and fire alarms, video surveillance, mobile and home automation solutions, access control, electronic article surveillance, robbery/assault notification and a range of loss prevention solutions.

Additionally, with the 2013 acquisition of Industry Retail Group, Inc (IRG) Vector Security is also a provider of managed infrastructure and business intelligence services in the United States, through its Vector Security Networks business division.

The company is based in Warrendale, Pennsylvania, and serves residential, commercial and North American multisite businesses through a network of branch locations and authorized dealers.

Vector Security dealers 
Vector Security, Inc. has an authorized dealer program. Under this program, independent dealers offer the same security system solutions offered by Vector Security branches. These security products and services are then monitored by Vector Security.

References

External links 
 
 Business Week: Company Overview of Vector Security

Security companies of the United States
Business services companies established in 1970
Technology companies established in 1970
Fire detection and alarm companies
1970 establishments in Pennsylvania